Camberwell was an electoral district of the Legislative Assembly in the Australian state of Victoria from 1945 to 1976. It centred on the eastern Melbourne suburb of Camberwell.

Members for Camberwell

Election results

References

Former electoral districts of Victoria (Australia)
1945 establishments in Australia
1976 disestablishments in Australia